Josefsen is a surname. Notable people with the surname include:

Annelise Josefsen (born 1949), Norwegian-Sami artist
Øystein Josefsen (born 1944), Norwegian businessman and politician
Turi Josefsen (born 1936), Norwegian-American businesswoman

Norwegian-language surnames